Nocardioides halotolerans is a Gram-positive, strictly aerobic, halotolerant and motile bacterium from the genus Nocardioides which has been isolated from farming field soil on Bigeum Island, Korea.

References

Further reading

External links
Type strain of Nocardioides halotolerans at BacDive -  the Bacterial Diversity Metadatabase	

halotolerans
Bacteria described in 2009